Martin Lee Gore (born 23 July 1961) is an English musician, singer, songwriter, record producer and DJ. He is one of the founding members of the electronic rock band Depeche Mode and is the band's main songwriter. He is the band's guitarist and keyboardist, and occasionally provides lead vocals. Gore possesses a tenor singing voice which contrasts with Dave Gahan's dramatic baritone. He is also known for his flamboyant and (sometimes) androgynous stage persona. Gore has also released several solo albums and collaborated with former Depeche Mode member Vince Clarke as part of VCMG.

Gore's songs include themes such as sex, religion and politics. He has said he feels lyrical themes that tackle issues related to solitude and loneliness are a better representation of reality, whereas he finds "happy songs" fake and unrealistic. At the same time, he asserts that the band's music contains "an element of hope".

In 1999, he received the Ivor Novello Award from the British Academy of Songwriters, Composers and Authors for "International Achievement". He was given the Moog Innovation Award "for his many contributions to the exploration of sound in popular music" in 2019, and became a Rock and Roll Hall of Fame member in late 2020 with fellow active Depeche Mode members Dave Gahan and Andy Fletcher, as well as past members Vince Clarke and Alan Wilder. Following the death of Fletcher in May 2022, Gore is the longest-serving member of the band.

Early life
Martin Lee Gore was born in London, England. His biological father was an African American G.I. stationed in Britain. Gore was raised by his stepfather David Gore and biological mother Pamela, who both worked at the Ford of Britain motor plant in Dagenham. He believed his stepfather was his biological father until the age of 30, when he learned of his biological father. Gore later apparently met his biological father in the American South. Gore has described his upbringing as "normal" and "stable" but said he was also an introvert and preferred to spend time reading alone rather than with school peers. However, he also stated that he enjoyed his time at school and took part in foreign exchange trips.

Gore taught himself to play keyboard from the 1970s, never receiving formal training. He learned to perform chart hits, figuring out their structures via the magazine Disco 45. He attended Nicholas Comprehensive School, Basildon, where he was the guitarist in a local band called Norman and the Worms. He shared a class with Andy "Fletch" Fletcher, Alison Moyet and Perry Bamonte. Gore left Nicholas Comprehensive after completing his A-levels in 1979 and took a job as a bank cashier. During evenings, weekends and any other spare time, he remained involved with Norman and the Worms. He became interested in electronic music upon hearing acts such as Kraftwerk, the Human League and Orchestral Manoeuvres in the Dark (OMD). He borrowed a Korg 700S from a friend, before purchasing a Yamaha CS5, his first synthesizer.

Gore has two younger half-sisters, Karen, born in 1967, and Jacqueline, born in 1968.

Depeche Mode

In 1980, Gore reunited with classmate Andy Fletcher at the Van Gogh club. Fletcher recruited him into his band Composition of Sound, along with Vince Clarke. Soon the band drafted Dave Gahan to be the band's lead singer after hearing him sing "Heroes" by David Bowie. Gore is the band's keyboardist, contributes backing vocals, and occasionally provides lead vocals.

When explaining the band's choice for their name, 'Depeche Mode' (which was taken from French fashion magazine Dépêche mode), Gore said, "It means 'hurried fashion' or 'fashion dispatch'. I like the sound of that." However, the magazine's name (and hence the band's) correctly translates to something like "Fashion News" or "Fashion Update". 

Gore wrote two tracks on Depeche Mode's debut album, Speak & Spell: "Tora! Tora! Tora!" and the instrumental "Big Muff". "Any Second Now (voices)" features Gore's first lead vocals for the band. When Clarke announced his departure from Depeche Mode in 1981, Gore became the principal songwriter for the band. Songs Gore wrote for Depeche Mode's second album, A Broken Frame (1982) differed musically and lyrically from Clarke's. Gore's writing became gradually darker and more political on subsequent Depeche Mode albums. He sings lead vocals on several of the band's songs, notably ballads – his tenor voice provides a contrast to Gahan's dramatic baritone. 

Gore sometimes plays guitar (typically his Gretsch White Falcon or Gretsch Double Anniversary) on Depeche Mode songs. The first time guitar was used as the main instrument was on "Personal Jesus", although he used small guitar parts on previous songs, such as "Behind the Wheel" and "Love, in Itself". Gore's guitar playing developed even more on Songs of Faith and Devotion. In live performances, he switches his keyboards for his guitar on some older Depeche Mode songs, such as "Never Let Me Down Again" and "A Question of Time". In mid-1990, Gore said, "I think in a way we've been at the forefront of new music; sort of chipping away at the standard rock format stations."

Other work
Gore has released the following solo albums: Counterfeit e.p. (1989), Counterfeit2 (2003), MG (2015) and The Third Chimpanzee (2021).

VCMG 
Former Depeche Mode colleague Vince Clarke collaborated with Gore for the first time since 1981 as techno duo VCMG on an instrumental minimalist electronic dance album called Ssss, released on 12 March 2012. The first single, Spock was first released worldwide exclusively on Beatport on 30 November 2011. The second, Single Blip was once again first released exclusively on Beatport on 20 February 2012, and the third one, Aftermaths was released on 20 August 2012.

MG 
In late February 2015, several teaser images were displayed on Gore's official Facebook page, citing a hashtag "MGxMG" which was later revealed to be a promotional tool for his new solo studio album, titled MG (named after his previous collaborative album, VCMG, with Vince Clarke from 2012). In a news post on his official website and various social media on 2 March, this confirmation of his new studio album announced its release would be on 27 or 28 April and previewed a track, Europa Hymn, from the new album.

Electric Ladyboy studio 
Gore has a personal studio in Santa Monica with a sizeable collection of Euroracks, Moog and Erica synthesizers (among others), where he recorded his solo work and wrote music for Depeche Mode.

Awards 

On 27 May 1999, Gore was presented with an award by Daniel Miller for "International Achievement" by the British Academy of Songwriters, Composers and Authors at the 44th Ivor Novello Awards.

Martin received the Moog Innovation Award "for his many contributions to the exploration of sound in popular music" in 2019.

Personal life
Gore lives in Santa Barbara, California. He started dating lingerie designer and model Suzanne Boisvert after meeting in Paris in 1989. They married in August 1994, had three children and divorced in 2006. He married Kerrilee Kaski in June 2014 and they have two daughters together.

He became a vegetarian for health and moral reasons (along with Alan Wilder) in 1983.

He suffered from stress-induced seizures during the band's 1993 Devotional Tour and publicly acknowledged his past alcoholism. During a stop on that Devotional Tour in Denver, Colorado, he was arrested by local police and fined $50 for holding a loud party in his hotel room.

Discography

Studio albums

Extended plays

Singles

with VCMG
Ssss (Mute, 2012)

Other appearances

Remixes
 1994 Spirit Feel – "Rejoice" (Mystic Span Mix)
 1995 Garbage – "Queer" (The Most Beautiful Woman in Town Mix)
 1999 ON – "Soluble Words" (Sublingual Remix)
 2003 Señor Coconut And His Orchestra – "Smooth Operator" (In-Disguise Remix)
 2013 Diamond Version – "Get Yours" (Martin L. Gore Remix)
 2022 Jean-Michel Jarre – "Brutalism Take 2"

Sources
 Malins, Steve. Depeche Mode : Black Celebration : The Biography. Andre Deutsch, 2007. 
 Miller, Jonathan. Stripped: Depeche Mode 2003, 2004, Omnibus Press 
 Tobler, John. NME Rock 'N' Roll Years (1st ed.). London: Reed International Books Ltd, 1992. CN 5585.

References

External links

 
 Martin Gore Interview in SPIN
 Martin Gore's DJ Chart from Beatport
 Martin Gore on BBC Radio 1's Residency programme (interview and mix) from BBC Radio 1

1961 births
Living people
English male singers
English people of African-American descent
English record producers
English songwriters
English tenors
Depeche Mode members
Ivor Novello Award winners
People from Basildon
English expatriates in the United States
Mute Records artists
People from Dagenham
Musicians from Essex
English multi-instrumentalists
English rock keyboardists
English new wave musicians
British synth-pop new wave musicians
20th-century English musicians
21st-century English musicians
Male new wave singers